Ras malai, originally known as rosomalai, or roshmalai, is a dessert from the Indian subcontinent. The dessert is called roshmalai/rosmalai in Bengali, ras malai in Hindi, and rasa malei in Odia. It is popular in India, Bangladesh and Pakistan.   

The origin of the sweet is impossible to verify but there are alternate stories identifying an origin in the Bengal region.

Origin and etymology
Ras malai is believed to have originated somewhere in Eastern Indian subcontinent, specifically in the Bengal region.  The Sen brothers of Comilla operating under the Matri Bhandar brand claim to be the original maker of the dessert. On the other hand, K.C. Das Grandsons also claims that it was invented by K.C. Das in Kolkata. Bangladesh has begun the process of registering geographical indication status for Comillar ras malai. 

According to The Diner's Dictionary: Word Origins of Food and Drink published by Oxford University Press "The term comes from Hindi raś 'juice', and malai 'cream'.

Ingredients
Ras malai consists of flattened balls of chhena soaked in malai (a type of clotted cream) flavoured with cardamom. Milk is boiled and a bit of vinegar or lime juice is added to split it. The whey is discarded and the milk solids are drained, cooled and kneaded into a dough. The dough is divided into small balls and the balls are cooked in hot water with a bit of rose water added. The balls are then cooked in milk with saffron, pistachios and kheer as stuffing.

Variations

Different types of ras malai can be found in different areas such Rasmanjuri of Rangpur division. In Dhaka and Rangpur, the ras malais are similar in shape to the rasgullas,and round discs.

See also

 Basundi
 Gulab jamun
 Khira sagara
 Rasabali

References

External links

Bangladeshi desserts
Culture in Comilla
Bengali desserts
Sweets of West Bengal
Indian desserts
Pakistani desserts
Muhajir cuisine
North Indian cuisine
Bengali cuisine